Women's 25 metre pistol (then called sport pistol) was one of the fifteen shooting events at the 1996 Summer Olympics. Li Duihong won the competition and set two new Olympic records.

Qualification round

OR Olympic record – Q Qualified for final

Final

OR Olympic record

References

Sources

Shooting at the 1996 Summer Olympics
Olymp
Shoo